The 2nd IIFA Utsavam ceremony honouring the winners and nominees of the best of South Indian cinema in 2016 was an event held on 28 and 29 March 2017 at the Hyderabad, Telangana, India. The event, which is the second edition of the IIFA Utsavam, recognises the best work from the four industries during the year 2016 and awarded prizes to performers and technicians from the Tamil, Telugu, Malayalam and Kannada languages.

Winners and nominees

Main awards

Kannada cinema 
The nominations for the films released during 2016 were announced early March 2017. Kirik Party lead the nominations list with 12 categories out of total 13 categories. Whereas Karvva and Godhi Banna Sadharana Mykattu bagged 9 nominations followed by U Turn with 6 nominations.

Malayalam cinema 
The nominations for the films released since October 2015 till the end of 2016 were announced on 14 March 2017. Maheshinte Prathikaaram topped the list of nominations in all 13 categories followed by Charlie with 11 nominations and Aadupuliyattam with 7 nominations.

Tamil cinema 
The nominations for the films released during 2016 were announced early March 2017. Chennai 600028 II lead the nominations list with 11 categories out of total 13 categories. Whereas Kabali finds spot in 8 categories, followed by critically acclaimed Visaranai and Irudhi Suttru in 5 categories, while Theri received 4 nominations.

Telugu cinema 
The nominations for the films released during 2016 were announced early March 2017. Janatha Garage and Oopiri topped with 9 nominations each out of total 13 categories followed by Pelli Choopulu with 8 nominations and Rudhramadevi with 7 nominations.

Special honors 
 Outstanding contribution to Indian cinema – K. Raghavendra Rao
 Outstanding contribution to Indian cinema – S. P. Muthuraman
 Lifetime Achievement Award — Dwarakish

Performers 
The following individuals performed musical numbers.

Ceremony information 
The event is being chiefly hosted by Rana Daggubati, who along with Nani, Akul Balaji and Meghana Gaonkar host for Telugu and Kannada Awards. Rana Daggubati along with Tini Tom, Pearle Maaney and Shiva host for Tamil and Malayalam Awards.

References

External links 
 

IIFA Utsavam
2016 Indian film awards